The Voice is a live album by vocalist Bobby McFerrin that was released in 1984. This was the first album by a jazz singer to be recorded without accompaniment or overdubbing.

Background
When McFerrin's album was released in 1984, it was exceptional for several reasons. The use of computers, synthesizers, and electronics in music was on the rise while McFerrin relied solely on his voice. One of the songs on the album is called "I'm My Own Walkman". He fit in the tradition of bebop vocalists for whom sound dominated lyrics and who imitated the sounds of saxophones and trumpets. But like Al Jarreau, he went beyond them by imitating all the instruments: drums, bass, flute, horns, guitar. He thumped his chest with his hands for percussive effects. He was the first jazz singer to sing while inhaling in addition to exhaling. He gave concerts as a soloist without instrumental accompaniment. His vocal styles varied, too, sometimes within one song in which he sang improvised lines with quick changes in register, falsetto, pops, grunts, while maintaining melody, harmony, and rhythm. One should also note his range. He is the son of an opera singer. He was voted Best Male Vocalist in DownBeat magazine in 1984 and 1985.

Track listing

Personnel
 Bobby McFerrin  – vocals

Production
 Linda Goldstein – producer
 Steve Addabbo – engineer
 Carlos Albrecht – engineer
 Stephen Innocenzi – editing
 Gene Paul – digital editing
 Jack Skinner – mastering

References

Bobby McFerrin albums
1984 albums
Elektra/Musician albums